Chungking Mansions is a building located at 36–44 Nathan Road in Tsim Sha Tsui, Kowloon, Hong Kong. Though the building was supposed to be residential, it is made up of many independent low-budget hotels, shops and other services. As well as selling to the public, the stalls in the building cater to wholesalers shipping goods to Africa and South Asia. The unusual atmosphere of the building is sometimes compared to that of the former Kowloon Walled City.

Chungking Mansions features guesthouses, curry restaurants, African bistros, clothing shops, sari stores, and foreign exchange offices. It often acts as a large gathering place for some of the ethnic minorities in Hong Kong, particularly South Asians (Indians, Nepalese, Pakistanis, Bangladeshis and Sri Lankans), Middle Eastern people, Nigerians, Europeans, Americans, and many other peoples of the world. Peter Shadbolt of CNN stated that the complex was the "unofficial African quarter of Hong Kong".

The building was completed on 11 November 1961, at which time Chinese residents predominated. Now, after more than five decades of use, there are an estimated 4,000 people living in the complex.

Building structure and housing

The building is named after the city of Chongqing, specifically its old postal name Chungking. Chungking Mansions is 17 storeys tall and consists of five blocks, named A, B, C, D and E.

There are two lifts in each block, one of which serves even-numbered floors, the other odd-numbered floors. A CCTV camera system exists at the ground floor level for each of the lift cars.

The first two floors are common spaces where residents are able to wander around under the blocks; the third floor is a terrace level between the blocks where the tower blocks start to rise out of the base of the building; and all floors above this floor are accessible only by the stairways and lifts contained in each block.

The separate Cke Shopping Mall, a few metres to the north of the main entrance, however, protrudes into the 3rd floor of blocks A and B.

Location

Chungking Mansions is located in one of the busiest districts of Hong Kong; it is very close to the Tsim Sha Tsui station and East Tsim Sha Tsui station of the MTR.

Kowloon Park is anchored by a mosque and this structure and the park itself are a popular refuge from the crowding of the Chungking Mansions and the surrounding area. The Hong Kong Cultural Centre and the Museum of Art are close by, across Salisbury Road.

Businesses
While Chungking Mansions is designated for residential use, the building includes a wide variety of commercial establishments.

Retail
There are three shopping arcades within Chungking Mansions. All have their main entrances on Nathan Road: the main arcade, Cke Shopping Mall and Wood House. The original mall was closed in 1998. It reopened later and the Cke and Wood House were created. In addition, shops and restaurants can be found on many floors.

 The main arcade is accessible from the main entrance. It is located on the ground floor and 1st floor of the building.
 Cke Shopping Mall. In 2003, the first and second floors were acquired by a developer for approximately HK$200 million, and spent HK$50 million on renovations. Under the new building plan, the  second floor was divided into 360 small shops measuring 50 to  each and resold. The new "Chungking Express" mall was relaunched at the end of 2004. It was later renamed Cke mall.
 Wood House is the latest addition. It is located in the basement of the building.

Many shops in the building are import/export businesses dealing in parallel goods that are predominantly sold to Asian and African countries. On the main floors as well as on upper floors in the towers, there are many restaurants that attract visitors from all over the world. For example, some small and family-run Indian and Pakistani restaurants with traditional Indian curry and Nepalese food are very well known. Due to competition between the very large number of restaurants inside the Mansions that are similar in style, many of them send staff to distribute leaflets on the streets to aggressively promote their restaurants.

There are many money changers located in the lower floors of Chungking Mansions who provide exchange services to the high number of people from all over the world living or doing business here.

Shops in the arcade sell not only traditional items from all over the world, but also trendy goods. Some of the shops found in the Mansions are different from those that are outside on the streets, selling articles which are imported from Asia and Africa. Computers, DVDs and VCDs, clothing, and some traditional snacks from foreign countries can be found inside Chungking Mansions.

Guesthouses
Chungking Mansions contains the largest number of guest houses in Hong Kong in one building, with 1980 rooms in total. Since it offers some of the cheapest rates in town, it has become a legendary haunt for backpackers and budget travellers.

Rooms and or floors are individually owned and managed. Space is at a minimum. Most rooms have one or two beds, a small TV, an "all-in-one toilet/shower" and a small closet. The beds are hard with a thin mattress and a small pillow. Most, if not all, rooms are equipped with an air conditioner.

Public safety

The age of the building, the diverse ownership and management structure are causes of the building's reputation for being a fire trap. Unsanitary conditions, security, ancient electrical wiring and blocked staircases all contribute to the hazards. On 21 February 1988, a fire broke out in the building. A Danish tourist who was trapped inside was killed. The fire, as well as a blaze in a similar building, provoked a review of rules and regulations concerning public safety.

In 1995, Chungking Mansions made local newspaper headlines when Sushila Pandey, a 37-year-old Indian tourist, was killed in the building by her Sri Lankan partner Attanayake Wasala Dangamuwa, 54.

In 2003, CCTV cameras were installed, and as of 2013, there are 330 CCTV cameras covering 70 per cent of the building's public spaces.

Chungking Mansions is known to be a centre of drugs, as well as a refuge for petty criminals, scammers, and illegal immigrants. For example, in a police raid in June 1995, about 1,750 people were questioned, and 45 men and seven women from Asian and African countries were arrested on suspicion of offences including failing to produce proof of identity, overstaying, using forged travel documents, possessing equipment for forging documents and possessing dangerous drugs. In "Operation Sahara" in 1996, 52 men and seven women from 14 countries were arrested for violating immigration regulations. An episode of National Geographic's Locked Up Abroad showed the location as the rendezvous for gold smugglers, contracted to be mules carrying 60 or more pounds of gold into Nepal.

Diversity
Chinese University of Hong Kong anthropologist Prof Gordon Mathews estimated in 2007 that people from at least 120 different nationalities had passed through Chungking Mansions in one year. Mathews also estimates that up to 20 per cent of the mobile phones recently in use in sub-Saharan Africa had passed through Chungking Mansions at some point.

With this mix of guest workers, mainlanders, locals, tourists and backpackers, the Chungking neighbourhood is one of the most culturally diverse locations in Hong Kong. Chungking Mansions was elected as the "Best Example of Globalization in Action" by Time magazine in its annual feature "The Best of Asia", although racial tensions are known to boil over occasionally.

In popular culture
Chungking Mansions served as one of the filming locations for Wong Kar-wai's 1994 movie Chungking Express, and is referenced in the title.

In Michael Connelly's novel Nine Dragons, detective Harry Bosch travels from Los Angeles to Hong Kong's Kowloon district in search of his missing daughter. Chungking Mansions is described by a character in the novel as a "post-modern Casablanca—all in one building."

The Economist compared it to the Mos Eisley cantina in the original Star Wars and quotes anthropologist Gordon Mathews: "whereas the illegalities in Chungking Mansions are widely known, the wondrousness of the place is not."

Chungking Mansions serves as the main scenery in the book Aap in Pak by Nicky Runge. The main protaganist follows the case of 4 missing women who have all been seen last in the Chungking Mansions.

See also

References

Further reading
 G. Mathews, Ghetto at the Center of the World: Chungking Mansions, Hong Kong, University of Chicago Press, 2011.
 M. Jäggi & J. Jansen Chungking Mansions – 3D In-Formality, Studio Basel, 2008.

External links

  , The Incorporated Owners of Chungking Mansions

Residential buildings completed in 1961
1961 establishments in Hong Kong
Tsim Sha Tsui
Apartment buildings in Hong Kong
Hotels in Hong Kong
Tourism in Hong Kong
Shopping centres in Hong Kong